Vasily Tikhonovich Romanenkov (Russian: 'Василий Тихонович Романенков; 1953-2013), was a Russian naïve artist of the Soviet and post-Soviet periods.

Biography 

Vasily Romanenkov was born in the village of Bogdanovka in Smolensk Oblast). In 1968 he graduated from 8-years school and moved to “Kosino” State farm near Moscow to live with his mother. There he apprenticed as a carpenter. In 1975–1980 Romanenkov studied at ZNUI (eng. Distance Learning National University of Arts) under N. Pavlov and N. Rotanov. The main feature of his art - a manner to draw with small strokes of different thicknesses, creating a kind of "moire" texture with the help of a pencil. Initially, Romanenkov tried to paint in oils, but on the advice of his teachers at ZNUI he engaged himself with the graphics. His first compositions, which he began to paint from the bottom, were distinguished with randomness of different shapes and patterns. Later, his works became more structured and gained the cyclic format, thus consisting of three or more separate works, each with its internal frame.
His cycles are devoted to Romanenkov's own biography, birth, baptism and death; the fate of the Ancient and Modern Russia. 
Vasily Romanenkov is widely known in Russia and abroad. He was awarded the Grand Prix at the International Triennial of Naive Art in Bratislava (Insita) at 2004 and received an honorable mention of the jury at the same exhibition in 1994 and 1997.

Personal exhibitions 

Evidence. Tsaritsyno State Museum, 1998
 Naive Art. Vasily Romanenkov. From the collection of Ksenia Bogemskaya, Central House of Artists, Moscow, 2002

Exhibitions 

 All-Union Exhibition of works of amateur artists, dedicated to the XVII Congress of Trade Unions, Moscow, 1982 
 Folk traditions, Moscow, 1986-1987 
 The image and perception, Moscow, 1990 
 Dream of Gold, Center for Contemporary Art, Moscow, 1992 
 Insita 94, 97, 2000, 2004 
 Naive Art of Russia, Moscow 1997, 1998 
 Wisdom is with the naive eyes, The Vasnetsov Brothers Art Museum, 1997 
 Naive art in the collection of K. Bogemskaya and A. Turchin, "Ark" exhibition hall, Moscow, 1998 
 Pushkin images, Moscow, 1999 
 Mastery of time, Gallery of the International University, Moscow, 2000 
 Galerie Hamer, Amsterdam, 1998 
 Naive art, 1998 
 Outsiders, Galerie Hamer, Amsterdam, 1999 
 Erste Begegnung (Germany), 1999 
 Russische Naieven vertellen, Museum de Stadshof, Zwolle, the Netherlands, 2000 
 Outsider's Art Fair, 2001-2004 
 Festnaiv’04 
 Art Manege Fair, Moscow, 2004 
 The Museum of everything, Garage Center for Contemporary Culture, Moscow, 2013
 Outsider Art Fair, Paris, 2014  
 Art brut // collection abcd, Expo Collective Contemporaine (collection of Bruno Decharme), 2014-2015
 Outsider Art Fair, Hôtel le A, Paris 2014

Collections 

 Tsaritsyno State Museum
 Charlotte Zander Museum, Besigheim, Germany
 Museum of Outsider Art, Moscow
 Museum of Naïve Art, Moscow
 Collection ABDC, Paris
 Collection Eternod-Mermod, Lausanne

Bibliography 

 Vasily Romanenkov, Certificates, 1998 
 Amateurish art // Amateur art: A Short History (1960-1990), Saint Petersburg, 1999 
 Pushkin's images in the works of naive artists of Russia: Catalog / M., 1999; 
 Erste Begegnung mit der Russische Naive, Museum Charlotte Zander. Schloss Boennigheim, 1999; 
 James Young. Whispers from the Universe: Vasiliy Romanenkov, Raw Vision #61 
 Outsiders, Galerie Hamer, Amsterdam, 1999 
 Raw Vision publications 
 К. Богемская. Понять примитив. Самодеятельное, наивное и аутсайдерское искусство в XX веке. СПб.: Алетейя, 2001 
 К. Богемская. В. Романенков (archive, not published)
 К. Богемская. Наивные художники России (Russian Naive and Outsider Artists), СПб.:Алетейя, 2009

References

1953 births
2013 deaths
Russian painters
Russian male painters
Draughtsmen
Soviet painters